Paul Bachman (Polly) Speraw (October 5, 1893 to February 22, 1962) was a  Major League Baseball third baseman. Speraw played for the St. Louis Browns in the 1920 season. In one career game, he had no hits in two at-bats. He batted and threw right-handed.

Speraw was born in Annville, Pennsylvania, and died in Cedar Rapids, Iowa.

External links

1893 births
1962 deaths
St. Louis Browns players
Hagerstown Terriers players
Baseball players from Pennsylvania
Cedar Rapids Bunnies players
Minor league baseball managers
Brockton Pilgrims players
Brockton Shoemakers players
Dubuque Tigers players
Elmira Colonels players
Evansville Evas players
Joplin Miners players
Lewiston Twins players
Mobile Bears players
Peoria Tractors players
Portland Mariners players
Zanesville Greys players